Ewelina Kobryn (born 7 May 1982) is a Polish professional women's basketball player who plays for Fenerbahçe Istanbul.

Career
So far she has been up nine times for the championship title She started playing basketball at the age of 17.

WNBA career
Kobryn was not drafted, but was signed by the Seattle Storm for 2011 and also played for the Phoenix Mercury. She won WNBA Champion in 2014 with Phoenix Mercury.

References

External links
WNBA stats

1982 births
Living people
Fenerbahçe women's basketball players
People from Tarnobrzeg
Phoenix Mercury players
Polish women's basketball players
Seattle Storm players
Sportspeople from Podkarpackie Voivodeship
Centers (basketball)
Forwards (basketball)
Galatasaray S.K. (women's basketball) players
Undrafted Women's National Basketball Association players